Daphnella flammea is a species of sea snail, a marine gastropod mollusk in the family Raphitomidae.

Description
The length of the shell varies between 10 mm and 15 mm.

The shell is spirally closely striated. The outer lip is minutely crenulated within. The sinus is somewhat obsolete. The shell is whitish, ornamented with waved longitudinal chestnut flames.

Distribution
This marine species occurs off New Guinea, Japan and in China Sea; also off Réunion

References

 Liu J.Y. [Ruiyu] (ed.). (2008). Checklist of marine biota of China seas. China Science Press. 1267 pp.

External links
 Gastropods.com: Daphnella (Daphnella) flammea
 

flammea
Gastropods described in 1843